Beatrice A. de Graaf (born 19 April 1976) is a Dutch history professor at the Faculty of Humanities at Utrecht University. Her areas of expertise are terrorism, international relations & security and the modern history of Europe.

Career 
De Graaf studied History and German at the University of Utrecht and the University of Bonn. In December 2004 she obtained her PhD with a dissertation on the relationship between the GDR, the peace movement and the Dutch churches. In 2005 she received the Max van der Stoel Human Rights Prize. After her PhD, De Graaf worked in Utrecht as a university lecturer. In 2007 she transferred to Leiden University, where she co-founded the Centre for Terrorism and Counterterrorism (CTC), attached to The Hague campus. In 2012, she was appointed professor of 'Conflict and security in historical perspective' at the CTC. In February 2014 she returned to Utrecht University, where she holds the chair entitled 'History of International Relations & Global Governance'.

As a historian, De Graaf puts security and counterterrorism in a historical context and aims to not only target an international-scientific audience but also contribute to a deeper understanding of these phenomena with her public books. Her book Against Terror. How Europe became safe after Napoleon (2018), was nominated for the Libris History Prize. Her 2021 book Radical Redemption: What Terrorists Believe was nominated for the Prize for the Most Important Book of the Year in the Netherlands, and for the Trouw and Nederlands Dagblad Best Theology Book in 2021/22. 

De Graaf's overarching research theme is the history of security and (counter)terrorism since the nineteenth century. Between 2009 and 2013 she conducted research in this area with a grant funded by the Dutch Research Council for the project Enemies of the State, and as a Fellow of the Netherlands Institute for Advanced Study (NIAS). In 2014 she received an ERC Consolidator Grant for the Securing Europe: Fighting its Enemies Project, for which she and a team of historians conducted research into the development of European security regimes between 1815 and 1914. She also carries out various research activities into terrorism and security in the twenty-first century, such as on the social effects of lawsuits against terrorists. In Terrorists on Trial, and several other publications, she shows how the 'pre-emptive turn' has also made its appearance in law, and how terrorism trials have increasingly become the subject of risk justice.

With her research team, de Graaf maps how societies and governments deal with war, conflict and crisis, and how they shape their security culture - as a result of threat, interest and security practices - around it. She is also part of the Adapt Academy. In the ADAPT Academy, researchers from Utrecht University, Leiden University, Radboud University, Vrije Universiteit Amsterdam and the University of Twente work together, with the aim of building more knowledge and expertise on the adaptive capacity of societies in times of crisis.

De Graaf also specialises in German history and the history of German-Dutch relations (following in the footsteps of her PhD supervisors Friso Wielenga and Duco Hellema). In 2018 she discovered evidence in Berlin’s archives that pointed to Queen Wilhelmina's involvement in the preparations for Emperor William II's arrival in the Netherlands, in November 1918. 

Since 2019 De Graaf is a distinguished professor at the Utrecht University. Her book Tegen terreur was translated to English in 2020 by the Cambridge University Press as Fighting Terror after Napoleon. Historian Michael Rowe, from King's College London, reviewed her book and wrote: "This well-written, engaging book combines an international-relations and systems perspective with historical methods and approaches."

Wider work 
In 2017, de Graaf was appointed a member of the Royal Netherlands Academy of Arts and Sciences. She is also a member of the Academia Europaea. She is the editor of Terrorism and Political Violence, as well as the Journal of Modern European History. She was a Visiting Fellow at St Catherine's College and the History Faculty of the University of Cambridge in 2016. She is also a fellow at the Programme on Extremism/ISIS Files project, George Washington University.

She was a member of the Joustra Committee on inter-country adoption and the Muller Committee on the revision of the Security Regions Act. As a terrorism expert and security historian, she regularly comments on current affairs in the media. On behalf of Terrorism and Political Violence and the Security History Network, she runs a podcast (together with Lena Harding) and is a recurring guest on the Ongelooflijke Podcast and on the Napoleonicist a podcast about the Revolutionary and Napoleonic wars. De Graaf is also a member of the Advisory Board of the Society and Security Foundation (SMV). 

In 1998 she became editor of Transparant (nl), the quarterly magazine of the VCH. She is a member of the Christian Union and was fifth on the candidate list for that party for the election to the Senate in 2015.

De Graaf is committed to increasing investment in research and science, and to increasing the impact of science in state and society. On 23 January 2015, Beatrice de Graaf was appointed chair of the National Science Agenda together with Alexander Rinnooy Kan. De Graaf has been writing a column for the NRC since 2018. In 2022, together with KNAW colleagues, she published the guide 'Science with the windows open'.  In 2022 she was asked to write the essay for the Dutch history month.

Awards 
 2005: Max van der Stoel human rights prize
 2011: Lecturer Prize, Koninklijke Nederlandse Akademie van Wetenschappen
 2011: Excellent Female Researcher Prize, Landelijk Netwerk Vrouwelijke Hoogleraren
 2012: Evaluating Counterterrorism Performance (2011, monograph) included in the global top 150 books on terrorism (Perspectives on Terrorism)
 2016: UU Publiprijs, Prize for best presentation and public education in the media
 2017: Language State Master.
 2018: Stevin Prize (2.5 million euros) awarded by the NWO.
 2018: Opzij Top 100 (nl) - most influential woman in the Netherlands in the Education and Science category.
 2022: Comeniusprijs, awarded in recognition of her historical insight and contribution to solving societal problems. 
 2022: Arenberg Prize for European History for Fighting Terror after Napoleon: How Europe Became Secure after 1815.

Publications 
 
 
 de Graaf, B. A., & Yayla, A. (2021). Policing as Rebel Governance. The Islamic State Police. (The ISIS Files). Program on Extremism.
 de Graaf, B. A. (2021). Red, White, and Blood: White Terror and Great Fear, 1789-2021. In: Age of Revolutions.
 
 0

References

External links 
 Profile of de Graaf on Academia Europea
 Profile of de Graaf on Universiteit Utrecht
 Beatrice de Graaf in het FID Benelux-Forschungsverzeichnis
The Conversation: Beatrice de Graaf
 
 
  (lecture by Beatrice de Graaf on February 7, 2023 at Stanford University)

1976 births
Living people
Dutch women historians
20th-century Dutch historians
21st-century Dutch historians
Members of the Royal Netherlands Academy of Arts and Sciences
Academic staff of Utrecht University